Indo Defence Expo & Forum is a biannual arms and defence technology sales exhibition as well as promotional event for international defence and security equipment manufacturers, which has been held since 2004 at JIExpo, Jakarta, Indonesia. It is the largest exhibition of its kind in Southeast Asia and a world calendar event.

Latest military, aviation, and nautical defence and security technologies are usually showcased at the event, which is also a meeting point of key decision makers from various defence authorities and companies from around the world. The exhibition is being participated by defence companies from countries all over the world. On the sidelines of the event seminars and symposiums also arranged to explore technology transfer among participating countries.

References

Arms fairs
Military industry
Annual events in Indonesia
Events in Jakarta